Railjet is a high-speed rail service in Europe operated by Austrian Federal Railways (ÖBB) and Czech Railways (ČD). Railjet is ÖBB's premier service and operates both domestically within Austria and on international services to adjacent major cities in the Czech Republic, Germany, Switzerland, Italy, Hungary and Slovakia.

History
Rather than choosing electric multiple units (EMUs) such as Deutsche Bahn's ICE 3, the ÖBB opted for locomotive-hauled push-pull high-speed trains, which could be hauled by its existing fleet of Taurus high-speed Siemens EuroSprinter electric locomotives. On 9 February 2006, 9 months after receiving sealed bids, the board of directors of the Austrian Federal Railways awarded Siemens a contract to build 23 sets of 7-coach trains, with the Siemens design viewed to be the best as well as the least expensive. In September 2007 Siemens received an additional order for 44 more Railjet trains from the Austrian Federal Railways. The total value of the order was €798 million for 469 passenger carriages.

In September 2011 Siemens agreed the sale of sixteen Railjet trainsets to the Czech Railways (České Dráhy); the sets should have been originally built for an uncompleted order for ÖBB, ČD's trainsets were to be hauled by Škoda's ČD Class 380 electric locomotives. In 2012 Czech Railways cancelled the order. A reduced order of seven Viaggio Comfort trainsets was agreed in August 2012.

In June 2014 ÖBB took up an option for a remaining nine railjets from Siemens, planned to be used on the Westbahn route between Vienna and Salzburg and will also be equipped to operate in Italy.

The first unit was produced on 15 September 2008, and put on display at Graz, then Innotrans in late September and then at Salzburger Verkehrstage on 15 October. The first railjet trains began test runs in late 2008.

Trainsets

A Railjet train set consists of seven individual coaches that are permanently coupled with airtight interconnections, but with buffer and hook couplings on the outer ends of the set of coaches suitable for buffer and chain screw coupling Two complete train sets with two locomotives can be run as a pair giving a train of fourteen carriages. The coach furthest from the locomotive acts as a control car. The number of carriages per train can be extended up to ten in a single train unit.

The industrial design company Spirit Design was contracted to provide an exterior and interior design, three colour schemes were presented and the livery to be used was decided by poll conducted by the Austrian tabloid Kronen Zeitung. In 2009 the railjet design was given a Red Dot award.

Traction

The Railjet vehicles are designed to be propelled in push-pull mode by standard electric locomotives, specifically the Siemens ES64U2 and ES64U4 (ÖBB Class 1116 and 1216 Taurus) already owned by the Austrian Federal Railways, but can also be hauled by any other electric or diesel locomotives.

The first twenty three ÖBB Class 1116 locomotives used in Railjet service were given a number of modifications: a third pantograph and the relevant train safety systems for operating outside Austria (Hungary, Switzerland and the Czech Republic) and a silver-colored side skirt below the floor level, giving a more streamlined appearance. A second set of twenty locomotives were equipped only for work in Austria and Germany and did not receive the side panels or extra systems for international working.

Carriages
The bodies of the vehicles are constructed from ribbed, cold-rolled steel, with the driving trailer deriving its forward end shape from the Taurus locomotives.

The passenger cars are equipped with electropneumatic disc brakes (3 per axle in SF400 bogies), as well as electromagnetic track brakes (eddy current brakes), and a parking brake. The driving trailer also has a manually operated brake using the disc brakes. Primary bogie suspension is by coil spring, and secondary suspension is pneumatic. The driving trailers are designated 'Afmpz', the premium and business class vehicle 'Ampz', the 'bistro' or restaurant car 'ARbmpz' and the economy class cars 'Bmpz'.

The intermediate passenger wagon bodyshells of the first units were manufactured by Siemens in Maribor, Slovenia. Final assembly takes place at the rail works at Simmering, Vienna; the first three trains were assembled by Siemens, the remainder by ÖBB technical services. The driving trailers are manufactured by ÖBB Infrastruktur Bauunder subcontract to Siemens.

Siemens is the main contractor for the vehicles and markets the coach design as Viaggio Comfort. Brake equipment is supplied by Knorr-Bremse, air-conditioning by Liebherr, and doors, carriage connections, toilets and seats are manufactured by other subcontractors.

Routes

Current network

As of December 2015, Railjets of ÖBB and ČD serve the following route network. Not all stops are shown, route sections only served by some trains are shown in brackets:

 (Budapest or Vienna International Airport -) Wien Hbf - Linz Hbf - Salzburg Hbf - München Hbf (- Augsburg - Stuttgart - Frankfurt)
 (Vienna International Airport -) Wien Hbf - Linz Hbf - Salzburg Hbf - Innsbruck Hbf (- Bregenz or Zürich)
 Wien Hbf - Klagenfurt Hbf - Villach Hbf (- Lienz or Udine - Venice from December 2017)
 (Berlin -) Praha hlavní nádraží - Brno hlavní nádraží - Wien Hbf - Graz Hbf

Some services are served by two joint trainsets which might be coupled and separated on their way. For example, a trainset incoming from Budapest is coupled with another incoming from Vienna International Airport at Vienna main station. They travel together until Salzburg (providing more passenger capacity on the Vienna - Salzburg core route), where one is separated and continues to Munich, while the other heads to Innsbruck.

All Railjets from and to Innsbruck, Bregenz and Zürich use the Deutsches Eck (German corner) transit route through Bavaria without stopping as this is the fastest route between Salzburg and western Tyrol due to the topography of the Austrian Alps. The Deutsches Eck provides a dedicated rail bypass near Rosenheim for this purpose.

From December 2018 faster Railjet trains were denominated as Railjet Express (RJX) between Salzburg and Vienna stopping only in Linz and Sankt Pölten in order to distinguish them from those with the additional stops in Vöcklabruck, Attnang-Puchheim, Wels, Sankt Valentin, Amstetten and Tullnerfeld.

Development
Commercial services started on 14 December 2008 between Munich, Vienna and Budapest, gradually replacing the former EuroCity connection until September 2009. Since 2011 trains run to Frankfurt (Main) and Wiesbaden on weekends. Since December 2014, trains serve the new Wien Hauptbahnhof, passing Wien Meidling and the Lainz Tunnel since 2015.

In December 2009 service started between Vienna via Innsbruck to Bregenz and Zürich. Services between Vienna and Bregenz/Zürich via Salzburg and Innsbruck were increased by the end of 2010. Following the completion of the track improvement works on the Westbahn in December 2012, the journey time between Vienna and Innsbruck is now about 4hr15min. From Wien Hauptbahnhof trains also serve Vienna Airport. Since 2011, Railjet trains also run on the Southern Railway line from Vienna to Graz and Klagenfurt/Villach. From 2013 to 2017 trains also served Lienz in East Tyrol. This service has been replaced by an Inter City Train.

On 15 June 2014, České dráhy inaugurated a Railjet connection from Wiener Neustadt to Prague. Since December 2014, trains run from Graz via Vienna and Brno to Prague main station (Praha hlavní nádraží).

From December 2016, newly delivered Railjet trainsets will replace further InterCity trains on existing routes within Austria. From December 2017, the existing Vienna - Villach route will be expanded to Venezia Santa Lucia via Udine. This is the first Railjet connection to a coastal region.

Services to Ljubljana and/or Zagreb have been discussed since 2010 but have since not materialized.

Passenger services
Railjet trains have three levels of service; economy, first and business classes.

Business class has the highest level of service, containing premium seating for 16 passengers located in the front part of the control car at the opposite end of the train to the locomotive. The seating plan is in an 'open compartments' style similar to a Corridor coach layout, but open plan and doorless, and intended to be a considerable improvement over previous first class accommodation. A galley separates the business and first class compartments.

First class seating occupies the remainder of the control car, the second coach and half of the third coach which also contains spaces and facilities for wheelchair users. 76 seats are provided in [2+1] formation. The remainder of the third coach contains the restaurant which provides an at seat service. The remaining four coaches provide 316 economy class seats in [2+2] formation, the fourth coach also contains an area for families and children.

From the thirty eighth set of trains onwards the galley is replaced with a seated restaurant area.

See also
 List of high-speed trains
 Train categories in Europe
 Nightjet

Notes

References

External links 

Czech Railways Railjet
Railjet Virtual 360° Tour
About Railjet

High-speed trains of Austria
High-speed trains of the Czech Republic
Western
Passenger trains running at least at 200 km/h in commercial operations
Railway services introduced in 2008